Ron Berger was an American college and professional football player.  A defensive end, he played college football at Wayne State University, and played professionally in the American Football League (AFL) and National Football League (NFL) for the Boston/New England Patriots.

Career
Berger began his career with a semi-pro team in Pontiac, Michigan, in 1965 with the St. Petersburg Blazers of the North American Football League.  The next year, the 6-foot-8 Berger played for the Orange County (Calif.) Ramblers of the Continental Football League before signing with the NFL's Los Angeles Rams.  He joined the Patriots as a free agent in 1969 as the biggest lineman to ever suit up for the team.

Burger played in 41 games for the Boston/New England Patriots.  His final season was with the Miami Dolphins in 1973.

1942 births
Living people
Players of American football from Detroit
American football defensive linemen
Wayne State Warriors football players
Boston Patriots players
New England Patriots players
American Football League players
Miami Dolphins players